Isidore Gluckstein (1851–1920) was a director of Salmon & Gluckstein tobacco merchants, and one of the founders of J. Lyons and Co., a restaurant chain, food manufacturing, and hotel conglomerate created in 1884 that dominated British mass-catering in the first half of the twentieth century.

Isidore Gluckstein was the son of Samuel Gluckstein, the founder of Salmon & Gluckstein.

He married Rose Cohen (1851–1908), and they had children:
 Hannah Ann Appel
 Barnett Salmon Gluckstein (1879–1941)
 Sir Samuel Gluckstein (1880–1958)
 Lena Gluckstein, married Harry Salmon
 Julia Gluckstein, married Frederick Levy (great-grandparents of Nigella Lawson)
 Major Montague Isidore Gluckstein OBE (1886–1958)
 Matilda Gluckstein

References

1851 births
1920 deaths
British Jews
British merchants
Isidore
Burials at Willesden Jewish Cemetery